Gatica, el mono is a 1993 Argentine drama film directed by Leonardo Favio. It is a biopic of Argentine boxer José María Gatica.
It won the Silver Condor for Best Film. The film was selected as the Argentine entry for the Best Foreign Language Film at the 66th Academy Awards, but Leonardo Favio asked the Instituto Nacional de Cinematografía (INC) to remove it as a nominee in order to protest in delays of the Congress' approval of the Foreign Films taxes.

In a survey of the 100 greatest films of Argentine cinema carried out by the Museo del Cine Pablo Ducrós Hicken in 2000, the film reached the 24th position. In a new version of the survey organized in 2022 by the specialized magazines La vida útil, Taipei and La tierra quema, presented at the Mar del Plata International Film Festival, the film reached the 20th position.

Cast
 Edgardo Nieva as Gatica
 Horacio Taicher as El Ruso
 Juan Costa as Jesús Gatica
 María Eva Gatica as Madre
 Erasmo Olivera as Gatica (teen)
 Kika Child as Ema
 Virginia Innocenti as Nora
 Adolfo Yanelli as El Rosarino

See also
 List of submissions to the 66th Academy Awards for Best Foreign Language Film
 List of Argentine submissions for the Academy Award for Best Foreign Language Film

References

External links
 

1993 films
1993 drama films
Argentine drama films
1990s Spanish-language films
Films directed by Leonardo Favio
1990s Argentine films